Vrata may refer to:

Vrata, a religious practice in Hinduism
Vrata, Dravograd, a settlement in Slovenia
Vrata, Mehedinți, a commune in Romania
Vrata, Primorje-Gorski Kotar County, a village in Croatia
Vrata Tunnel, a tunnel in Croatia

See also
Brat (disambiguation)